David Alexander (born October 17, 1974), better known by his stage name The Dirtball, is an American recording solo artist, a former member of hip hop group Kottonmouth Kings whom he joined in early 2010, and the punk rock group collaboration X-Pistols with Daddy X also formerly of the Kottonmouth Kings and members of So Cal punk group D.I.

Discography

Albums
The Dirty D Project Vol. 1 (November 26, 2002)
Pop-A-D-Ball (March 29, 2005)
Raptillion (September 19, 2006)
Crook County (May 19, 2008)
Nervous System (March 1, 2011)
Desert Eagle EP (May 22, 2012)
Skull Hollow (February 22, 2019)
Back of the Woods (TBA)

Compilations
Subnoize Souljaz presents In The Trenches Vol. 3: The Dirtball (2009)

Kottonmouth Kings
Long Live The Kings (2010)
Legalize It (EP) (2011)
Sunrise Sessions (2011)
Hidden Stash V: Bongloads & B-Sides (2011)
Mile High (August 14, 2012)
Krown Power (August 28, 2015)

X-Pistols
Shoot To Kill (2011)

References

American hip hop musicians
Living people
People from Prineville, Oregon
Rappers from Oregon
Year of birth missing (living people)
People from Bend, Oregon
21st-century American rappers